Oskar Reinhold Bloch (born 20 October 2000) is a Danish footballer who plays as a defender.

Career

Youth
Bloch played with youth teams at Fløng-Hedehusene for 7 years and FC Roskilde for a further 2 years, before moving to FC Midtjylland in 2015, where he was part of back-to-back U19 club championship teams, as well as part of the team who made it to the quarterfinals of the 2018-19 UEFA Youth League. Following his release from Midtjylland in 2019, Bloch opted to move to the United States to play college soccer at the University of Cincinnati.

Professional

Slegelse B&I
Bloch opted to forgo moving to the United States, and instead joined Danish 2nd Division side Slagelse B&I on 12 August 2019. He made 13 league appearances and 2 cup appearances for the club.

AB
After a season with Slagelse, Bloch signed with AB on 3 February 2020.

New England Revolution II
However, just a month after signing with AB, Bloch moved to the United States with USL League One side New England Revolution II. He made his debut on 7 August 2020, appearing as a 78th-minute substitute during a 2–0 loss to Orlando City B. He left New England in August 2020.

References

External links
Oskar Bloch | New England Revolution

2000 births
Living people
Akademisk Boldklub players
New England Revolution II players
Danish 2nd Division players
USL League One players
Danish men's footballers
Danish expatriate men's footballers
Association football defenders